Lobesia bicinctana is a moth belonging to the family Tortricidae. The species was first described by Philogène Auguste Joseph Duponchel in 1844.

It is native to Europe and Northern America.

References

External links

Olethreutini